Menachem Magidor (Hebrew: מנחם מגידור; born January 24, 1946) is an Israeli mathematician who specializes in  mathematical logic, in particular set theory. He served as president of the Hebrew University of Jerusalem, was president of the Association for Symbolic Logic from 1996 to 1998, and is currently the president of the 
Division for Logic, Methodology and Philosophy of Science and Technology of the International Union for History and Philosophy of Science (DLMPST/IUHPS; 2016-2019). In 2016 he was elected an honorary foreign member of the American Academy of Arts and Sciences. In 2018 he received the Solomon Bublick Award.

Biography 
Menachem Magidor was born in Petah Tikva, Israel. He received his Ph.D. in 1973 from the Hebrew University of Jerusalem. His thesis, On Super Compact Cardinals, was written under the supervision of Azriel Lévy. He served as  president of the Hebrew University of Jerusalem from 1997 to 2009, following Hanoch Gutfreund and succeeded by Menachem Ben-Sasson. The Oxford philosopher Ofra Magidor is his daughter.

Mathematical theories 
Magidor obtained several important consistency results on powers of singular cardinals substantially developing the method of forcing. He generalized the Prikry forcing in order to change the cofinality of a large cardinal to a predetermined regular cardinal. He proved that the least strongly compact cardinal can be equal to the least measurable cardinal or to the least supercompact cardinal (but not at the same time). Assuming consistency of huge cardinals he constructed models (1977) of set theory with first examples of nonregular ultrafilters over very small cardinals (related to the famous Guilmann–Keisler problem concerning existence of nonregular ultrafilters), even with the example of jumping cardinality of ultrapowers. He proved consistent that  is strong limit, but . He even strengthened the condition that   is strong limit to that generalised continuum hypothesis holds below . This constituted a negative solution to the singular cardinals hypothesis. Both proofs used the consistency of very large cardinals. Magidor, Matthew Foreman, and Saharon Shelah formulated and proved the consistency of Martin's maximum, a provably maximal form of Martin's axiom. Magidor also gave a simple proof of the Jensen and the Dodd-Jensen covering lemmas.

Selected published works

References 

1946 births
Living people
Academic staff of the Hebrew University of Jerusalem
20th-century  Israeli mathematicians
21st-century  Israeli  mathematicians
Set theorists
Tarski lecturers
Presidents of universities in Israel
Gödel Lecturers